Dhekelia Cantonment is a military base in Akrotiri and Dhekelia, a British Overseas Territory on the island of Cyprus, administered as the Sovereign Base Areas. It is located in the Eastern Sovereign Base Area, one of the two areas which comprise the territory. It is the larger of the British military bases on the island, and it is also the location of Alexander Barracks, which is home to 2nd Battalion, The Princess of Wales's Royal Regiment. In autumn 2017 the 2nd Battalion Royal Anglian Regiment deployed to Dhekelia replacing 2nd Battalion, The Princess of Wales's Royal Regiment.

It forms a part of British Forces Cyprus.

The eastern part of the cantonment includes Ayios Nikolaos Station and a Green Line crossing point.  The western part includes several Greek Cypriot enclaves including Xylotymbou, Ormidhia and Dhekelia Power Station.  The two parts of the cantonment are joined by a narrow corridor little wider than the road between them.

See also
British Forces Cyprus
Episkopi Cantonment
Episkopi, Limassol
Royal Military Police
Sovereign Base Areas
Sovereign Base Areas Customs
Sovereign Base Areas Police
St. John's School

References

Geography of Akrotiri and Dhekelia
Installations of the British Army
Military of Sovereign Base Areas of Akrotiri and Dhekelia